William Lewis Dewart (June 21, 1821 – April 19, 1888) was a Democratic member of the U.S. House of Representatives from Pennsylvania.

Biography
William L. Dewart (son of Lewis Dewart) was born in Sunbury, Pennsylvania.  He attended the common schools of Sunbury and Harrisburg, Pennsylvania.  He was graduated from Dickinson Preparatory School in Carlisle, Pennsylvania, and from Princeton College in 1839.  He studied law, was admitted to the Northumberland County, Pennsylvania, bar in 1843, and commenced practice in Sunbury.  He served as chief burgess of Sunbury in 1845 and 1846, and as president of the school board.  He was a delegate to the Democratic National Conventions in 1852, 1856, 1860, and 1884.  He was an unsuccessful candidate for election in 1854.

Dewart was elected as a Democrat to the Thirty-fifth Congress.  He served as chairman of the United States House Committee on Revisal and Unfinished Business.  He was an unsuccessful candidate for reelection in 1858.  He resumed the practice of law in Sunbury and died there in 1888.  Interment in the family vault in Sunbury Cemetery.

His granddaughter Betty Brice (born Rosetta Dewart Brice, 1888-1935) was an actress in silent films.

Sources

The Political Graveyard

1821 births
1888 deaths
Pennsylvania lawyers
Politicians from Harrisburg, Pennsylvania
People from Sunbury, Pennsylvania
Democratic Party members of the United States House of Representatives from Pennsylvania
19th-century American politicians
19th-century American lawyers